Oblon, McClelland, Maier & Neustadt, L.L.P. (often abbreviated to Oblon) is an intellectual property law firm in Alexandria, Virginia.  Founded in 1968 by Norman F. Oblon, Oblon is one of the largest law firms in the United States focusing exclusively on intellectual property law. The law firm performs trademark and patent prosecution, as well as litigation and Post-Grant Proceedings before the Patent Trial and Appeal Board (PTAB). The firm has been ranked first among law firms based on the number of utility patent applications filed per annum for 27 years.

Attorneys at Oblon include Arthur Neustadt, who argued successfully before the Supreme Court of the United States on behalf of respondent Shoketsu Kinzoku K.K. in the case of Festo Corp. v. Shoketsu Kinzoku Kogyo Kabushiki Co., as well as Charles "Chico" Gholz, in the field of patent interference practice.

The firm publishes two blogs on IP related topics one being on Design Patents (protectingdesigns.com) and the other US ITC Section 337 practice (ITCblog.com).

The firm is headquartered in Alexandria, Virginia, adjacent to the campus of the United States Patent and Trademark Office, with an affiliate office in Tokyo, Japan.

Philippe Signore, Ph.D., is the firm’s Managing Partner and a patent attorney practicing in the firm's Electrical and Mechanical Patent Prosecution group; Patent Litigation group; Counseling and Strategic Advice group and the Industrial Designs group.

References

External links
Oblon homepage
Oblon's ITC 337 Law Blog
Oblon's Protecting Designs Law Blog

Patent law firms
Companies based in Alexandria, Virginia
Companies based in Arlington County, Virginia
Law firms based in Virginia
Law firms established in 1968
1968 establishments in Virginia
American companies established in 1968